Miguel de Oquendo y Segura, was a Spanish Admiral. Born in San Sebastián (Gipuzkoa) in 1534, died at sea in 1588 when returning from the Spanish Armada campaign.

He was the father of Admiral Antonio de Oquendo.

Principal events of his life
1575 Took part with his own ship in the voyage of Orán.
1582 As Captain General of the Guipúzcoa Squadron, took part in the Battle of Terceira under Álvaro de Bazán. 
1583 Took part in the landing and conquest of Terceira, having himself reconnoitred its coast.
1588 Commanded the Guipuzcoa Squadron and, with Recalde, he was second in command of the Spanish Armada. His ship caught fire and had to be abandoned. He died at sea on the return journey.

1588 deaths
Spanish admirals
16th-century Spanish people
People who died at sea
People of the Anglo-Spanish War (1585–1604)
Year of birth unknown